Serhiy Oleksandrovych Sydorchuk (born 2 May 1991) is a Ukrainian professional footballer who plays as a midfielder for Dynamo Kyiv, whom he captains, and the Ukraine national team.

Club career

Metalurh Zaporizhzhia
Born in Zaporizhzhia, Sydorchuk is product of the youth system of his hometown club FC Metalurh Zaporizhzhia. He made his debut for FC Metalurh entering as a second-half substitute against FC Metalurh Donetsk on 23 August 2009 in the Ukrainian Premier League.

Dynamo Kyiv
On 21 December 2012, Sydorchuk signed a five-year contract with Dynamo. On 11 August 2013, he scored his first goal for the club in a league match against FC Chornomorets Odesa. On 29 September 2015, Sydorchuk made his UEFA Champions League debut in the second match of the group stage against Israeli club Maccabi Tel Aviv away from home, which Dynamo won 2–0.

International career
Sydorchuk made his full international debut for Ukraine on 9 October 2014, replacing captain Ruslan Rotan in the 64th minute of a European qualifier away to Belarus in Barysaw. In added time, he scored the second goal of a 2–0 win, a close-range finish set up by Andriy Yarmolenko. Three days later in the next qualifier at the Arena Lviv, he scored the only goal to defeat Macedonia.

Career statistics

Club

International

Scores and results list Ukraine's goal tally first, score column indicates score after each Sydorchuk goal.

Honours
Dynamo Kyiv
Ukrainian Premier League: 2014–15, 2015–16, 2020–21
Ukrainian Cup: 2013–14, 2014–15, 2019–20, 2020–21
Ukrainian Super Cup: 2016, 2018, 2019, 2020

Metalurh Zaporizhzhia
Ukrainian First League runner-up: 2011–12

References

External links
 
 

1991 births
Living people
Footballers from Zaporizhzhia
Ukrainian footballers
Association football midfielders
Ukraine youth international footballers
Ukraine international footballers
UEFA Euro 2016 players
UEFA Euro 2020 players
FC Metalurh Zaporizhzhia players
FC Metalurh-2 Zaporizhzhia players
FC Dynamo Kyiv players
Ukrainian Premier League players
Ukrainian First League players
Ukrainian Second League players